Coxiella is a genus of aquatic gastropod mollusks in the family Tomichiidae. These snails that live in saline lakes, and have gills and an operculum.

Distribution 
The distribution of genus Coxiella includes Tasmania and Australia: southern Australia, central Australia and northern Queensland.

Species
Davis (1979) recognized 10 species (9 in Australia) and one subrecent species Coxiella badgerensis in Tasmania.

Species within the genus Coxiella include:

subgenus Coxiella
 † Coxiella badgerensis (Johnston, 1879) - subrecent
 Coxiella exposita Iredale, 1943
 Coxiella glabra MacPherson, 1957
 Coxiella glauertii MacPherson, 1954
 Coxiella minima MacPherson, 1954
 Coxiella molesta Iredale, 1943
 Coxiella pyrrhostoma (Cox, 1868)
 Coxiella striata (Reeve, 1842)
 Coxiella striatula (Menke, 1843) - type species

subgenus Coxielladda Iredale & Whitley, 1938
 Coxiella gilesi (Angas, 1877)

Ecology 
This genus consists of halophilic species which occur in temporal and permanent saline lakes.

Coxiella snails are iteroparous. When the saline lake dries out, adults of Coxiella are able to survive.

References

Truncatelloidea